Lily Jane Collins (born 18 March 1989) is a British and American actress and model.  Her work in films includes  Stuck in Love (2012), The English Teacher (2013), and Love, Rosie (2014), comedy Rules Don't Apply (2016) and Netflix drama To the Bone (2017). Since 2020, she has been portraying the role of Emily Cooper in the Netflix series Emily in Paris.

Born in Guildford, Surrey and raised in Los Angeles, Collins began performing on screen at the age of two in the BBC sitcom Growing Pains. In the late 2000s, Collins began acting and modelling more regularly, and she had a career breakthrough with her performance in the sports-drama film The Blind Side, which was the third highest-grossing film of 2009. She went on to appear in leading roles across feature films such as the sci-fi action-horror Priest (2011), the psychological action-thriller Abduction (2011), the fantasy Mirror Mirror (2012), the urban fantasy The Mortal Instruments: City of Bones (2013), and the independent romantic comedies Stuck in Love (2012), The English Teacher (2013), and Love, Rosie (2014).

Collins was critically acclaimed for her roles as Marla Mabrey in the comedy Rules Don't Apply (2016), which earned her a nomination for the Golden Globe Award for Best Actress – Motion Picture Musical or Comedy, and for her portrayal of a young adult with anorexia in the controversial Netflix drama To the Bone (2017). She has also achieved recognition for her work in biographical films: she starred as Liz Kendall in the Netflix drama Extremely Wicked, Shockingly Evil and Vile (2019), as J.R.R. Tolkien's wife Edith in Tolkien (2019), and as Rita Alexander in Mank (2020), the latter of which was a critical success, earning 10 Academy Award nominations.

Collins played Fantine in the BBC miniseries adaptation of Les Misérables (2018–2019), and, since 2020, she has portrayed Emily Cooper in the Netflix series Emily in Paris. For the latter, she received a nomination for the Golden Globe Award for Best Actress – Television Series Musical or Comedy. She made her writing debut with Unfiltered: No Shame, No Regrets, Just Me (2017) in which she discussed her struggles with mental health, including an eating disorder she suffered as a teenager.

Early life
Lily Jane Collins was born on 18 March 1989 in Guildford, Surrey, the daughter of English musician Phil Collins and his second wife, Jill Tavelman, an American who is the former president of the Beverly Hills Women's Club. Her maternal grandfather was a Canadian Jewish immigrant who for many years owned a men's clothing store in Beverly Hills, California. Collins is the half-sister of musician Simon Collins and actress Joely Collins from her father's first marriage, and she has two other younger half-brothers from her father's third marriage.
Her uncle was the cartoonist Clive Collins.

After her parents' divorce in 1996, which occurred when she was six, Collins moved to Los Angeles with her mother. She graduated from Harvard-Westlake School and attended the University of Southern California, majoring in broadcast journalism. She was presented as a debutante at the Bal des débutantes in Paris in 2007. As a teenager, Collins suffered from an eating disorder that she later revealed in her book, Unfiltered: No Shame, No Regrets, Just Me.

Career

2007–2012: Early work and breakthrough 

Collins began acting at the age of two in the BBC series Growing Pains. In 2009, Collins appeared in two episodes of the teen drama series 90210, including the first season's finale. Later that year, Collins had her breakthrough starring in the film The Blind Side as Collins Tuohy, the daughter of Leigh Anne Tuohy (Sandra Bullock's character). The film was a commercial success, grossing over $250 million at the box-office and emerging as the highest-grossing sports drama of all time.

In 2011, she played the warrior priest's daughter Lucy in the thriller Priest, opposite Paul Bettany. Although it was a critical and commercial failure, she earned praise for her performance; MTV Networks' NextMovie.com named her one of the Breakout Stars to Watch for in 2011. She co-starred in the 2011 action film Abduction with Taylor Lautner.

In 2012, Collins played Snow White in Mirror Mirror, an adaptation of the fairytale Snow White and the Seven Dwarfs, co-starring Julia Roberts as the Evil Queen Clementianna. Robbie Collin from the British newspaper The Daily Telegraph wrote of Collins: "She has an adorable, sensational, almost perfect face for cinema; think Audrey Hepburn with the eyebrows of Liam Gallagher. Her smile is the platonic ideal of cheeky." Collins made her singing debut in the film, performing an English re-written cover of "I Believe (in Love)". Also in 2012, Collins portrayed Samantha in Stuck in Love, starring alongside Jennifer Connelly, Logan Lerman, and Greg Kinnear.

2013–2016: Rise to prominence and critical recognition 

Collins was initially cast as the lead in the 2013 remake of Evil Dead, but dropped out due to a scheduling issue. She played the title role as an earth-visiting alien in M83's music video Claudia Lewis, released in August 2013. She then starred as Clary Fray in The Mortal Instruments: City of Bones, a film adaptation of the first book in The New York Times best-selling The Mortal Instruments novels, written by Cassandra Clare. The role earned her a Teen Choice Award nomination in 2014. In October 2013, Collins appeared in the music video for "City of Angels" by Thirty Seconds to Mars. In 2014, Collins starred as Rosie Dunne in the film adaptation of Love, Rosie, alongside Sam Claflin, written by Cecelia Ahern. Love, Rosie, was negatively received, although her performance was praised, with Donald Clarke of The Irish Times describing her as "perfectly charming." 

Collins had a leading role as aspiring actress Marla Mabrey, alongside Alden Ehrenreich, in the romantic comedy-drama Rules Don't Apply (2016), from filmmaker Warren Beatty, who also starred as billionaire Howard Hughes. When the film was released in November, it received mixed reviews and only grossed $3.9 million against its $25 million budget. Despite this, for her role as Marla Mabrey, Collins received her first Golden Globe nomination for Best Actress in a Comedy or Musical at the 74th Golden Globe Awards. In 2016, Collins was part of a pilot produced for The Last Tycoon, loosely based on F. Scott Fitzgerald's last book The Last Tycoon. She played Cecelia Brady, daughter of Pat Brady, who was played by Kelsey Grammer. Amazon picked up the pilot to series on 27 July 2016 but later cancelled their plans for a second season in September in 2017.

In March 2016, Collins joined the anorexia drama film To the Bone in the lead role, written and directed by Marti Noxon. The film follows Ellen or Eli, a 20-year-old woman suffering from anorexia nervosa. It premiered in competition at the Sundance Film Festival on 22 January 2017, as a contender in the U.S. Dramatic Competition. It was released worldwide on Netflix on 14 July 2017. When the film was first released on Netflix there was some controversy about whether the film would be triggering for those with eating disorders. This controversy was also influenced by another Netflix original show 13 Reasons Why after it was accused of glamorising suicide. Despite the taboo topic of the movie, Collins's depiction of Ellen was described as "exemplary work from Lily Collins in the central role." Justin Chang of Los Angeles Times wrote that "In a different film, Ellen's sharp tongue might have made her an insufferable fount of wisecracking negativity, but Collins' performance is subtler than that, and the script gives her ample opportunity to reveal the character's more complicated, vulnerable edges."

2017–present: Established actress 

Collins was also cast in the Netflix drama film Okja directed by Bong Joon-ho, alongside Jake Gyllenhaal and Tilda Swinton. The film competed for the Palme d'Or in the main competition section at the 2017 Cannes Film Festival and received a four-minute standing ovation after its premiere. It was released on Netflix on 28 June 2017. In 2017, it was revealed that Les Misérables would be adapted by Andrew Davies into a BBC mini series directed by Tom Shankland and starring Collins alongside Dominic West and David Oyelowo. Collins starred as Fantine, a young woman in Paris who is abandoned by her wealthy lover, forcing her to look after their child, Cosette, on her own. They began filming the series in February 2018 in Belgium and Northern France. Critics and fans praised Collins's performance as Fantine; Alexandra Pollard of The Independent wrote that "[Collins] plays the tragic Fantine with steeliness and grace," in a "magnificent" performance, while another critic stated that "Lily Collins does not sing her anguished soul out when she is abandoned by her lover. So much so, she impressed me from the get-go with her emotionally rich performance."

In 2019, Collins co-starred with Zac Efron in the drama Extremely Wicked, Shockingly Evil and Vile, directed by Joe Berlinger. She plays Elizabeth Kendall, Ted Bundy's long-time girlfriend, who struggles to accept that her boyfriend is a serial killer. The film had its world premiere at the Sundance Film Festival on 26 January. Also that year, Collins co-starred as Edith Tolkien, the wife of author J. R. R. Tolkien, in the biographical film Tolkien, with Nicholas Hoult in the title role. Filming began in October 2017 and wrapped in December, and Tolkien was released on 10 May 2019.

In 2020, Collins starred opposite Simon Pegg in the thriller Inheritance directed by Vaughn Stein, and in Emily in Paris, a Netflix television series about a young American working in Paris. For Emily in Paris, Collins received a second Golden Globe Award nomination for Best Actress – Television Series Musical or Comedy. That same year, she portrayed Rita Alexander, an English transcriber to writer Herman J. Mankiewicz, in the critically-acclaimed film Mank. Collins is scheduled to star in The Cradle directed by Hope Dickinson Leach, opposite Jack O'Connell, and in Gilded Rage opposite Christoph Waltz and Bill Skarsgård, produced by Jake Gyllenhaal and directed by Charlie McDowell.

In June 2021, it was announced that Collins would produce a new film about the children's toy Polly Pocket while also playing the title role.

Image and activism 
As a teenager, Collins wrote a column, "NY Confidential," for the British magazine Elle Girl. She has also written for Seventeen, Teen Vogue, and the Los Angeles Times. She was selected by Chanel to wear one of their gowns at the 2007 Bal des débutantes at the Hôtel de Crillon in Paris, which was featured on season three of the reality television series The Hills. She was picked by Spain's Glamour magazine in 2008 as its International Model of the Year, and appeared on the magazine's cover in August 2009.

Collins covered the 2008 US presidential election as a host on the Nickelodeon series Kids Pick the President. She won a 2008 Young Hollywood Award for Newest Red Carpet Correspondent. Collins was one of 20 women named by Maxim magazine as one of the Hottest Daughters of Rock Stars in 2009.

Collins is an outspoken anti-bullying advocate and is serving as a Celebrity Ambassador to anti-bullying organisation Bystander Revolution. Since 2018, Collins is an ambassador of the GO Campaign, a nonprofit organisation that raises awareness and funds to improve the lives of orphans and vulnerable children around the world.

Personal life

Collins stated in 2013 that she does not like to discuss the interest in her relationships publicly due to witnessing the difficulties caused by the media coverage of her parents' divorce. In September 2020, she announced her engagement to American film director and writer Charlie McDowell. They were married on 4 September 2021 at Dunton Hot Springs, Colorado.

Awards and nominations

References

External links

 
 
 
 

1989 births
20th-century American actresses
20th-century English actresses
21st-century American actresses
21st-century English actresses
Actresses from Los Angeles
Actresses from Surrey
American child actresses
American debutantes
American film actresses
American people of Canadian descent
American people of English descent
American socialites
American television actresses
Television personalities from Los Angeles
American women television personalities
Anti-bullying activists
British debutantes
Debutantes of le Bal des débutantes
English child actresses
English emigrants to the United States
English female models
English film actresses
English people of American descent
English people of Canadian descent
English people of Jewish descent
English socialites
English television actresses
English television personalities
Female models from California
Harvard-Westlake School alumni
Jewish American actresses
Jewish English actresses
Living people
Actors from Guildford
Phil Collins
USC Annenberg School for Communication and Journalism alumni